Abacetus aenigma is a species of ground beetle in the subfamily Pterostichinae. It was described by Maximilien Chaudoir in 1869 and is found in multiple countries in Asia. The species is found in the Cambodia, China, Laos and Vietnam.

References

aenigma
Beetles described in 1869
Insects of China
Insects of Southeast Asia